Double-loop learning entails the modification of goals or decision-making rules in the light of experience. The first loop uses the goals or decision-making rules, the second loop enables their modification, hence "double-loop". Double-loop learning recognises that the way a problem is defined and solved can be a source of the problem. This type of learning can be useful in organizational learning since it can drive creativity and innovation, going beyond adapting to change to anticipating or being ahead of change.

Concept 
Double-loop learning is contrasted with "single-loop learning": the repeated attempt at the same issue, with no variation of method and without ever questioning the goal. Chris Argyris described the distinction between single-loop and double-loop learning using the following analogy:

Double-loop learning is used when it is necessary to change the mental model on which a decision depends. Unlike single loops, this model includes a shift in understanding, from simple and static to broader and more dynamic, such as taking into account the changes in the surroundings and the need for expression changes in mental models. It is required if the problem or mismatch that starts the organizational learning process cannot be addressed by small adjustments because it involves the organization's governing variables. Organizational learning in such cases occurs when the diagnosis and intervention produce changes in the underlying policies, assumptions, and goals. According to Argyris, many organizations resist double-loop learning due to a number of variables such as resistance to change, fear of failure, and overemphasis on control.

Western Approaches Tactical Unit

The Western Approaches Tactical Unit of the Royal Navy during WW2 is an example of an organization that received information and takes action, but the result is not desirable. The development of corrective measures requires an assessment of the organization's essential characteristics, is double loop learning. This means that errors are detected and remedied in ways that change the organization's basic standards, policies, and goals.

The Western Approaches Tactical Unit was able to develop and update anti-submarine tactical doctrine between 1942 and 1945 as new technology and assets became available. WATU enabled the Royal Navy to "replicate a learning organization that successfully could challenge existing norms, objectives, and policies pertaining to trade defense even when applied to geographically diverse theaters of operation."

Historical precursors 
A Behavioral Theory of the Firm (1963) describes how organizations learn, using (what would now be described as) double-loop learning:

See also 

 
 Higher-order thinking
 Learning cycle
 Learning organization
 Mental model
 Metacognition
 Neurathian bootstrap
 Reflective equilibrium
 Reflective practice
 Second-order cybernetics

References

Further reading 
 
 
 
 
 
 
 
 
 
 
 
 
 
 

Learning methods